Wiley X is an American private company that designs and manufactures protective eyewear.

Overview 
In 1987, U.S. Army Veteran Myles R. Freeman Sr. founded the company Protective Optics, Inc. in Daly City, California by creating shooting glasses for several FBI agents from one office.

In 1990, the company began producing protective eyewear and sunglasses for civilian needs, e.g. in motorsport, cycling, fishing, hunting, and industrial manufacturing. In November 2007, Protective Optics, Inc. changed its name to Wiley X, Inc.

The company moved the headquarters in 2010 to a building in Livermore, California where it remained until moving to Frisco, TX in 2022.

Wiley X has partnerships with professional athletes, non-profits and the entertainment industry over.

Protection Standards 
According to Patrick Sweeney, an American gunsmith, Wiley X are capable of stopping a birdshot at ten yards.

In a book Battle Rattle (2006 Windrow & Greene) by Hans Halberstadt the author states that the 82nd Airborne Division was the first one to buy Wlley X in bulk, ordering thousands of the SG-1s goggles, originally developed for Ranger regiment, shorty after deploying in Afghanistan in spring 2002.

Wiley X is eyewear meets the ANSI Z87.1+ standards for clarity, high-velocity and high mass impacts.

Outdoor.com magazine gave rather a good review in its 2023 review.

Appearance in movies and TV 
American Sniper, Army of the Dead, Bright (2017), SWAT, The Office, Big Little Lies

References 

Eyewear brands